Al-Hawi or Kitāb al-Ḥāwī fī al-ṭibb translated as The Comprehensive Book on Medicine is a medical composition authored by Rhazes in the 10th century.

It was first translated into Latin in 1279 under the title Continens by Faraj ben Salīm, a physician of Sicilian-Jewish origin employed by Charles of Anjou.

The oldest partial remaining copy of this work belongs to the National Library of Medicine in Bethesda, Maryland dated 1094 CE.

References

Iranian physicians
History of medicine in Iran